The Amudarya district (Karakalpak: Әмиўдәрья районы, Ámiwdárya rayonı) is a district of Karakalpakstan in Uzbekistan. The capital lies at Mangit.

There are one city Mangit, four towns Jumurtov, Kipshak, Kilishbay and Xitay and 16 village councils Nazarxan, Orta-qala, Kipshak, Quyuq-kopir, Xitay, Aq altin, Shaykul, Kilishbay, Kanli, Amir Temur, Durman, Bobur nomli, Buzyop, Tolqin, Tashyop and Xolimbeg.

References

Karakalpakstan
Districts of Uzbekistan